Exuma International Airport  is a public airport serving the island of Great Exuma in the Bahamas. It is located near Moss Town, northwest of George Town. The airport services mainly light aircraft and regional jets from the United States and The Bahamas.

Facilities

As of May 2020, there was one terminal and boarding area at the commercially served airport. For general aviation, Odyssey Aviation operates an FBO with direct access to the ramp. The Bahamian government has designated Exuma International Airport as an important part of the Bahamian tourism economy and made plans to further develop the airport with a budget of $44 million. The additional development will include a new terminal building and fire rescue building. The new building will also include space for retail and Bahamian government agencies, with construction anticipated to "commence in the first quarter of 2021." Renovation of the airport will also include the runway, aprons and a new taxiway.

Airlines and destinations

Passenger

References

External links
 
 

Airports in the Bahamas
Exuma